A nomenclator (English plural nomenclators, Latin plural nomenclatores; derived from the Latin nomen- name + calare - to call), in classical times, referred to a slave whose duty was to recall the names of persons his master met during a political campaign. Later this became names of people in any social context and included  other socially important information.

However, it has taken on several other meanings and also refers to  a book containing collections or lists of words. It also denotes  a person, generally a public official, who announces the names of guests at a party or other social gathering or ceremony.

In more general terms still, it is a person who provides or creates the names for things, and this can apply to the application of names in a scientific or any other context, but especially in relation to specialist terminologies, glossaries etc.

Nomenclators in biology 
Several nomenclators have been created in biology. They usually list the names of genera and sometimes species together with the origins (sources) of these names. Sometimes they also include additional information, such as the distribution.

For instance, an entry in the Nomenclator Zoologicus looks like this:
 Abronia Gray 1838, Ann. Mag. Nat. Hist., 1 (5), 389. Rept.
Abronia is a genus of lizard that was described by John Edward Gray in 1838 in the journal Annals and Magazine of Natural History. The entry ends with a note about the animal group the genus belongs to, namely the reptiles ("Rept.").

See also 
 Nomenclator Botanicus Hortensis
 Farley file

References

Scientific nomenclature
House slaves